Events in the year 1803 in Germany

Incumbents

Holy Roman Empire 
 Francis II (5 July 17926 August 1806)

Important Electors
 Baden- Charles Frederick (27 April 18036 August 1806)
 Bavaria- Maximilian I (16 February 17996 August 1806)
 Saxony- Frederick Augustus I (17 December 176320 December 1806)
 Württemberg - Frederick I (180330 October 1816)

Kingdoms 
 Kingdom of Prussia
 Monarch – Frederick William III of Prussia (16 November 17977 June 1840)

Grand Duchies 
 Grand Duke of Mecklenburg-Schwerin
 Frederick Francis I (24 April 17851 February 1837)
 Grand Duke of Mecklenburg-Strelitz
 Charles II (2 June 17946 November 1816)
 Grand Duke of Oldenburg
 Wilhelm (6 July 17852 July 1823) Due to mental illness, Wilhelm was duke in name only, with his cousin Peter, Prince-Bishop of Lübeck, acting as regent throughout his entire reign.
 Peter I (2 July 182321 May 1829)
 Grand Duke of Saxe-Weimar
 Karl August  (1758–1809) Raised to grand duchy in 1809

Principalities 
 Schaumburg-Lippe
 George William (13 February 17871860)
 Schwarzburg-Rudolstadt
 Louis Frederick II (13 April 179328 April 1807)
 Schwarzburg-Sondershausen
 Günther Friedrich Karl I (14 October 179419 August 1835)
 Principality of Lippe
 Leopold II (5 November 18021 January 1851)
 Principality of Reuss-Greiz
 Heinrich XIII (28 June 180029 January 1817)
 Waldeck and Pyrmont
 Friedrich Karl August  (29 August 176324 September 1812)

Duchies 
 Duke of Anhalt-Dessau
 Leopold III (16 December 17519 August 1817)
 Duke of Saxe-Altenburg
 Duke of Saxe-Hildburghausen (1780–1826)  - Frederick
 Duke of Saxe-Coburg-Saalfeld
 Francis (8 September 18009 December 1806)
 Duke of Saxe-Meiningen
 Bernhard II (24 December 180320 September 1866)
 Duke of Schleswig-Holstein-Sonderburg-Beck
 Frederick Charles Louis (24 February 177525 March 1816)

Other
 Landgrave of Hesse-Darmstadt
 Louis I (6 April 179014 August 1806)

Events 
 25 February – A major redistribution of territorial sovereignty within the Holy Roman Empire is enacted via an act known as the Reichsdeputationshauptschluss.
 30 May – Following Britain's declaration of war on France, Édouard Mortier leads 12,000 troops in an Invasion of Hanover
 5 July – The convention of Artlenburg confirms the French occupation of Hanover (which had been ruled by the British king).

Births

January–June 
 15 February
 John Sutter, pioneer (died 1880)
 Karl Friedrich Schimper, botanist, naturalist and poet (died 1867)
 26 February – Arnold Adolph Berthold, physiologist and zoologist (died 1861)
 17 March Carl Jacob Löwig, chemist (died 1890)
 12 May – Justus von Liebig, chemist (died 1873)

July–December 
 8 July – Julius Mosen, poet (died 1867)
 17 July – Johann Samuel Eduard d'Alton, anatomist (died 1854)
 19 July – Wolfgang Franz von Kobell, mineralogist and writer (died 1882)
 5 October – Friedrich Bernhard Westphal, painter (died 1844)
 29 November – Gottfried Semper, architect (died 1879)
 26 September – Adrian Ludwig Richter, German painter (died 1884)
 6 October – Heinrich Wilhelm Dove, German physicist and meteorologist (died 1879)
 31 December – Johann Carl Fuhlrott, German paleoanthropologist (died 1877)

Deaths

January–June 
 18 February – Johann Wilhelm Ludwig Gleim, poet (born 1719)
 14 March – Friedrich Gottlieb Klopstock, poet (born 1724)

July–December 
 18 December – Johann Gottfried Herder, philosopher and writer (born 1744)

References

 
Years of the 19th century in Germany